Ferland is a  fransaskois hamlet in Mankota Rural Municipality No. 45, Saskatchewan, Canada. It previously held the status of village until November 4, 1988. The hamlet is located 10 km east of the Village of Mankota on highway 18.

Demographics

Prior to November 4, 1988, Ferland was incorporated as a village, and was restructured as a hamlet under the jurisdiction of the Rural municipality of Mankota on that date.

In 2012, the government recognised the significant influence the francophone population had in Ferland's history, and so permanently installed a fransaskois flag in the hamlet.

Infrastructure

Ferland Airport

See also

List of communities in Saskatchewan
Hamlets of Saskatchewan

References

Mankota No. 45, Saskatchewan
Former villages in Saskatchewan
Unincorporated communities in Saskatchewan
Populated places disestablished in 1988
Division No. 3, Saskatchewan